Whiteoak Run is a  long 2nd order tributary to Tomlinson Run in Hancock County, West Virginia.

Course
Whiteoak Run rises about 0.5 miles east of Lennyville, West Virginia, in Hancock County and then flows generally south to join Tomlinson Run at about 1.5 miles northeast of Moscow.

Watershed
Whiteoak Run drains  of area, receives about 37.7 in/year of precipitation, has a wetness index of 314.57, and is about 68% forested.

See also
List of rivers of West Virginia

References

Rivers of Hancock County, West Virginia
Rivers of West Virginia